Naucleopsis is a plant genus in family Moraceae.

Species

References

External links
 Naucleopsis Miq. at Tropicos. Retrieved 4 December 2013.

Further reading
 

 
Flora of South America
Taxonomy articles created by Polbot
Taxa named by Friedrich Anton Wilhelm Miquel
Moraceae genera